LaSalle Detention U.S. Immigration and Customs Enforcement, operated by the GEO Group and located on 830 Pinehill Road, about two miles northwest of downtown Jena, LaSalle Parish, Louisiana.  People were first imprisoned there in 2007 and it has a capacity of 1160.

References

Prisons in Louisiana
GEO Group
Buildings and structures in LaSalle Parish, Louisiana
Immigration detention centers and prisons in the United States
2007 establishments in Louisiana